Poulsbo is a city on Liberty Bay in Kitsap County, Washington, United States. It is the smallest of the four cities in Kitsap County. The population was 9,200 at the 2010 census and an estimated 10,927 in 2018.

The area was historically inhabited by the Suquamish people, many of whom moved to the Port Madison Indian Reservation after the signing of the Treaty of Point Elliott in 1855. Poulsbo was founded in the 1880s by Norwegian immigrant Jørgen Eliason, who was joined by other Scandinavians who relocated from the Midwestern states. They were drawn here by the availability of land, by the area's rich resources, and by a landscape similar to their native home. The settlement was connected by boats to other areas of the region, including the Puget Sound mosquito fleet, which was eventually usurped by highways built in the early 20th century.

Modern-day downtown Poulsbo maintains a Scandinavian theme to honor its early immigrant history and is a popular regional tourist destination. One of its local products, Poulsbo Bread, is made locally at Sluys Bakery and used to be sold internationally. Many visitors arrive by boat; there are three marinas near the town, and the town's harbor is an excellent anchorage.

History

The Suquamish people inhabited the area at the north end of Liberty Bay for millennia and had several names for modern-day Poulsbo; one of those names, tcu-tcu-lats, means "place of the maples". The Suquamish occupied villages on the Liberty Bay shoreline — among them, ho-CHEEB — for at least 5,000 years, hunted in local forests and floodplains, fished in bays and streams here, and harvested shellfish along the shoreline.

After the signing of the Treaty of Point Elliott in 1855, most Suquamish people here relocated to the Port Madison Indian Reservation.

Founded by Norwegian immigrant Jørgen Eliason in the 1880s, Poulsbo was settled in its early years by a large number of Norwegian and other Scandinavian immigrants because of its similarities to their native countries. In 1886, Iver Brynildsen Moe, one of the early Norwegian settlers, suggested that the community should have a post office. Moe suggested the town be named "Paulsbo", his hometown in Halden, Norway. The community's petition for a post office was granted and Moe became the first postmaster, but authorities in Washington, D.C. misspelled the town's name, likely misreading Moe's handwriting, and the community became known as "Poulsbo" thereafter. Poulsbo was incorporated on December 18, 1907.

Until World War II, many Poulsbo residents retained Norwegian as a primary language. However, during World War II, the military constructed about 300 residential units to provide housing for workers at the nearby Puget Sound Naval Shipyard in Bremerton. The population of Poulsbo almost tripled over three years, and the diversification of the population led to the dominance of English as the primary language.

On October 22, 1975, King Olav V of Norway visited Poulsbo as part of the celebration of 150 years of Norwegian immigration to the United States. His son, Harald, visited 20 years later.

Education
Poulsbo is home to many different public schools in the North Kitsap School District. North Kitsap High School, Poulsbo Middle School, Poulsbo Elementary School and Vinland Elementary School are located within the city limits, while Pearson Elementary School lies south of town. Private schools include Gateway Christian School and West Sound Academy. Post-secondary undergraduate education includes Olympic College Poulsbo.

Chief Kitsap Academy in Suquamish is outside of the Poulsbo city limits and has a Poulsbo postal address.

Northwest College of Art & Design was formerly in the Poulsbo area. The school, established in 1982 as the Northwest College of Art, was initially in Lemolo in Poulsbo. In 1991 the institution began leasing the former Mains Manor in Suquamish, which was purchased in 2000. The Squamish tribe had purchased the former college building for $5.03 million on November 28, 2017 and made it into the current Chief Kitsap Building. The college, at that time, moved to Tacoma, having purchased a building there.

Geography

Topography
Poulsbo is located in northern Kitsap County at  (47.739137, -122.639278), at the north end of Liberty Bay, a sheltered arm of Puget Sound. Washington State Route 305 has its northwestern terminus in the northern part of the town at State Route 3 and leads southeast  to the ferry docks at Bainbridge Island. SR 3 leads north  to Port Gamble and south  to the western part of Bremerton.

Surrounding municipalities

Climate

Culture

Media
The North Kitsap Herald has published continuously since 1901, providing local news for Poulsbo as well as the greater Kitsap County area. The Herald was founded by Peter Iverson, who served as mayor of Poulsbo and state legislator. Today, the Herald is owned by Sound Publishing. In Kitsap, Sound also publishes the Bainbridge Island Review, Central Kitsap Reporter, and Port Orchard Independent (Fridays); Kingston Community News (monthly); as well as KitsapDailyNews.com and BainbridgeReview.com (daily online).

Landmarks
First Lutheran Church opened in 1886 atop the hill, overlooking downtown Poulsbo, and was originally Førdefjord Lutheran.

Norseman Statue

The Norseman Statue, a  statue by artist Mark Gale of Tacoma, stands at Viking Avenue and Lindvig Way.

The statue was commissioned by the city to replace a wooden sign at Viking Avenue and Lindvig Way. The statue was created by Tacoma, Washington based artist Mark Gale. The  project was coordinated by local businessman Bill Austin and Poulsbo Mayor Becky Erickson. Privately funded by the Bjorgen Beautification Fund, the statue cost $25,000. The statue was first unveiled November 23, 2012 at a traditional city tree lighting ceremony.

The Norseman statue constitutes 500 pounds of rebar steel and 5,000 pounds of cement. The statue stands on a foundation engraved with the words Velkommen til Poulsbo.  It is located on the western edge of town, on the southeast corner of Viking Ave. NW and NW Lindvig Way.

Parks

Poulsbo's Fish Park is a  park in Poulsbo. The park was started in 2002 by a group of community members and governments including the City of Poulsbo and the Suquamish Tribe.

The park is centered on the Dogfish Creek estuary at the north end of Liberty Bay. , the park had  of trails with the city planning to double that figure.

During the fall salmon run, Washington State University's extension service conducts salmon tours at locations on Kitsap Peninsula including Fish Park.

Sister cities
Poulsbo has two sister cities, both in Norway:
 Kautokeino
 Namsos

Demographics

2010 census
As of the census of 2010, there were 9,200 people, 3,883 households, and 2,310 families residing in the city. The racial makeup of the city was 82.9% White, 9.2% Hispanic or Latino, 5.7% Asian, 1.1% African American, 0.9% Native American, 0.3% Pacific Islander, 3.6% from other races, and 5.4% from two or more races.

There were 3,883 households, of which 30.8% had children under the age of 18 living with them, 61% were married couples living together, 11.4% had a female householder with no husband present, 3.2% had a male householder with no wife present, and 40.5% were non-families. 34.7% of all households were made up of individuals, and 17.4% had someone living alone who was 65 years of age or older. The average household size was 2.30 and the average family size was 2.97.

The median age in the city was 40.2 years. 23.8% of residents were under the age of 18; 7.8% were between the ages of 18 and 24; 24.7% were from 25 to 44; 24.5% were from 45 to 64; and 19.4% were 65 years of age or older. The gender makeup of the city was 45.3% male and 54.7% female.

2000 census
As of the census of 2000, there were 6,813 people, 2,845 households, and 1,772 families residing in the city. The population density was 2,121.5 people per square mile (819.5/km2). There were 2,992 housing units at an average density of 931.7 per square mile (359.9/km2). The racial makeup of the city was 88.1% White, 4.8% Hispanic or Latino, 3.0% Asian, 1.0% African American, 1.0% Native American, 0.4% Pacific Islander, 1.9% from other races, and 4.6% from two or more races. 14.6% were of German, 10.6% Irish, 10.0% English and 9.5% Norwegian ancestry. 95.3% spoke English and 2.6% Spanish as their first language.

There were 2,845 households, out of which 30.9% had children under the age of 18 living with them, 48.6% were married couples living together, 10.9% had a female householder with no husband present, and 37.7% were non-families. 32.1% of all households were made up of individuals, and 15.8% had someone living alone who was 65 years of age or older. The average household size was 2.30 and the average family size was 2.92.

In the city, the population was spread out, with 24.2% under the age of 18, 7.5% from 18 to 24, 26.8% from 25 to 44, 22.1% from 45 to 64, and 19.5% who were 65 years of age or older. The median age was 39 years. For every 100 females, there were 86.7 males. For every 100 females age 18 and under, there are 78.7 males.

The median income for a household in the city was $38,875 and the median income for a family was $51,353. Males had a median income of $40,482 versus $27,899 for females. The per capita income for the city was $20,649. 9.1% of the population and 8.2% of families were below the poverty line. Out of the total population, 14.1% of those under the age of 18 and 6.0% of those 65 and older were living below the poverty line.  A large number of employed individuals work on the east side of Puget Sound, in Seattle or other King County cities, and commute to work by ferry.

Notable residents
 Margaret Olofsson Bergman, weaver
 James W. Douglass, author, peace activist, and Gandhian nonviolent Christian theologian
 Jason Everman, former member of Nirvana, U.S. Army Special Forces
 Richard F. Gordon Jr., Apollo 12 astronaut
 Aaron Sele, Major League Baseball pitcher
 Scott Shipley, Olympic canoeing medalist
 Harland Svare, former NFL player and coach
 Ryan Villopoto, pro motocross rider
 Tarn Adams, creator of Dwarf Fortress

Major roads

References

External links

  City of Poulsbo official website
 Greater Poulsbo Chamber of Commerce
 Kitsap Peninsula Visitor & Convention Bureau
 Annual Viking Fest

Finnish-American culture in Washington (state)
Norwegian-American culture in Washington (state)
Cities in Kitsap County, Washington
Cities in the Seattle metropolitan area
1907 establishments in Washington (state)
Populated places established in 1907